In enzymology, a methenyltetrahydrofolate cyclohydrolase is an enzyme that catalyzes the chemical reaction

5,10-methenyltetrahydrofolate + H2O  10-formyltetrahydrofolate

Thus, the two substrates of this enzyme are 5,10-methenyltetrahydrofolate and H2O, whereas its product is 10-formyltetrahydrofolate.

This enzyme belongs to the family of hydrolases, those acting on carbon-nitrogen bonds other than peptide bonds, specifically in cyclic amidines.

This enzyme participates in glyoxylate and dicarboxylate metabolism and one carbon pool by folate.

Synonyms
The systematic name of this enzyme class is 5,10-methenyltetrahydrofolate 5-hydrolase (decyclizing).

Other names in common use include:
 Citrovorum factor cyclodehydrase
 cyclohydrolase
 formyl-methenyl-methylenetetrahydrofolate synthetase (combined).

Structural studies

References 

 
 

EC 3.5.4
Enzymes of known structure